Marcelo Javier Tejeda Brugnoli (born August 5, 1986) is a Salvadoran professional footballer of Uruguayan descent. Tejeda is the son of the Uruguayan professional footballer Julio "Chacho" Tejeda.

Career
He began his career playing for several clubs in Uruguay, these included C.A. Cerro, Liverpool Montevideo, Bella Vista, Fenix, Institución Atlética Potencia.

Tejeda joined Luis Ángel Firpo for 2013 season, helping them win the title before signing a two-year deal with Atlético Marte.

References

1988 births
Living people
Sportspeople from Santa Ana, El Salvador
Association football defenders
Salvadoran footballers
Salvadoran people of Uruguayan descent
C.A. Cerro players
Liverpool F.C. (Montevideo) players
Centro Atlético Fénix players
C.A. Bella Vista players